Dmytro Hryhorovych Riznyk (born 30 January 1999) is a Ukrainian professional footballer who plays as a goalkeeper for Shakhtar Donetsk in the Ukrainian Premier League.

Career 
Riznyk is a product of FC Vorskla Youth Sportive School from his native Poltava. In July 2016 he was promoted to the Vorskla main squad to compete in the Ukrainian Premier League Reserves. And in September 2019 Riznyk was promoted to the main-squad team of FC Vorskla in the Ukrainian Premier League.

He made his debut as a start-squad player for Vorskla Poltava in the Ukrainian Premier League in a losing match against FC Zorya Luhansk on 26 October 2019.

On 10 February 2023, Shakhtar Donetsk announced the signing of Riznyk on a five-year contract.

International career

Youth
From 2011, until 2012, Riznyk has been part of Ukraine at youth international level, respectively has been part of the U19. U20 and U21 teams and he with these teams played four matches. He was a part of the Ukraine U20 that won the 2019 FIFA U-20 World Cup, even if he not played any game and spent a time on the bench.

Senior
He made his debut for Ukraine national football team on 11 November 2021 in a friendly against Bulgaria.

Career statistics

Club

International

Honours
Vorskla Poltava
Ukrainian Cup runner-up: 2019–20

Ukraine U20
FIFA U-20 World Cup: 2019

References

External links 
 
 

1999 births
Living people
Ukrainian footballers
FC Vorskla Poltava players
FC Shakhtar Donetsk players
Ukrainian Premier League players
Association football goalkeepers
Ukraine international footballers
Ukraine youth international footballers
Ukraine under-21 international footballers
Sportspeople from Poltava Oblast